James Brodie (15 September 1637 – March 1708) was a Scottish politician.

He was the only son of Sir Alexander Brodie, Lord Brodie  (1617–1680), a Lord of Session.

He represented Elgin and Forfarshire in the 1689 Convention of the Estates of Scotland
and Elginshire in the parliaments of 1689 to 1702 and 1703 to 1707 (sitting only to 1704).

He married Mary Kerr, a daughter of the 3rd Earl of Lothian, with whom he had 9 daughters.

References 
 

1637 births
1708 deaths
Members of the Convention of the Estates of Scotland 1689
Members of the Parliament of Scotland 1689–1702
Members of the Parliament of Scotland 1702–1707